The Livin' La Vida Loco World Tour was the first major world concert tour by Puerto Rican singer Ricky Martin to support his first English-language album Ricky Martin. The tour started in October 1999 and continued until October 2000.

The tour covered four continents, North America, Europe, Asia and Australia. According to 2000 year-end report, Ricky Martin had the 10th highest-grossing tour in the US, with 44 shows grossing $36.3 million and drawing an audience of 617,488. That October, attendance and sales data reported from 60 concert dates in the United States, Canada and Mexico show the tour grossed $51.3 million and drew 875,151 fans, according to Billboard Boxscore, International dates, not reported to Boxscore would push Martin's grosses higher.

Opening act
Jessica Simpson (North America, 1999 dates)

Setlist
This setlist represents concerts held Summer 2000
"Livin' la Vida Loca"
"Love You for a Day"
"Bombón de Azúcar"
"Spanish Eyes"
"Lola, Lola"
"Vuelve"
"She Bangs"
"Loaded"
"Marcia Baila"
"Private Emotion"
"I Am Made of You"
"Shake Your Bon-Bon"
"La Bomba"
"Por Arriba, Por Abajo"
"María"
"She's All I Ever Had"
"The Cup of Life"

Tour dates

Cancellations and rescheduled shows

Box office score data

References

1999 concert tours
2000 concert tours
Ricky Martin concert tours